Arapaho Glacier is an alpine glacier in a cirque immediately southeast of North Arapaho Peak, in Roosevelt National Forest in the U.S. state of Colorado. The glacier is just east of the Continental Divide. Arapaho Glacier is the largest glacier in the state of Colorado and helps provide water for the city of Boulder, Colorado. The glacier has a negative glacier mass balance and lost over 52% of its surface area during the 20th Century.

See also
List of glaciers in the United States

References

External links
Glaciers and Glacier Change in Rocky Mountain National Park

Glaciers of Colorado
Landforms of Boulder County, Colorado